HMS Biter is an  P2000-type patrol and training vessel of the British Royal Navy. She is assigned to Manchester & Salford Universities Royal Naval Unit, a Royal Naval Reserve unit based in Manchester. As part of her sea training programme, she often makes visits to local ports for ceremonial visits or occasions.

Construction
She was built by Watercraft Ltd. at Shoreham-by-Sea in 1986 as one of ten vessels ordered as the P2000 class. The class was based on a design of an Omani coastguard cutter built by Watercraft Marine. They are twin-shaft vessels with moulded glass-reinforced plastic hulls. She has no dedicated armament though she can be fitted with pintle-mounted L7 7.62 mm GPMG machine guns. Biter is part of the First Patrol Boat Squadron (1PBS) based at HMNB Portsmouth.

During overhaul, two Cat C18 ACERT propulsion engines were installed by Finning Power Systems. The two diesel engines, each rated at 873 bhp at 2200 rpm, form part of the propulsion package along with ZF 2000 RV marine reverse reduction gearboxes and ZF 9000 Series ClearCommand controls.

Service history
Biter was commissioned in 1986 into the Royal Navy and she was attached to Mersey Division, a Royal Naval Reserve Unit. In 1990, she was transferred to Manchester and Salford University Royal Naval Unit. Biters time at sea includes weekends visiting local ports such as Holyhead, Douglas and Barrow-in-Furness and deployments during the Easter and summer holidays when she visits ports around the UK and northern Europe. She is attached to the Manchester and Salford University Royal Naval Unit (URNU) and her main role is to provide Naval training to URNU students on weekends and in Easter and summer deployments.

As part of her sea training programme, she often makes visits to local ports for ceremonial visits or occasions. In May 1993, she attended the Battle of the Atlantic 50th Anniversary Fleet Review. In December 2005, she helped to start the Round the World Clipper Race in Liverpool. She also regularly visits her affiliated town of Silloth in Cumbria for Remembrance Sunday commemorations.

Ship's company
Biter is commanded by a lieutenant and is permanently crewed by four other Royal Navy personnel. Chief petty officers fill the roles of executive officer and marine engineering officer, and the yeoman and weapons engineering officer are junior rates of the appropriate service branches. With students embarked (up to a maximum of 12), a training officer is usually present who is typically an RNR lieutenant or sub-lieutenant.

Affiliates
 
 Royal Naval Reserve (RNR)
 Manchester and Salford Universities Air Squadron (MASUAS) 
 Manchester & Salford Universities Officer Training Corps (MSUOTC) 
 Merchant Taylor's School CCF
 The North West of England & Isle of Man Reserve Forces and Cadets Association (NW RFCA)
 Silloth, Cumbria
 Manchester District Sea Cadets

Notes

References

External links

 

Archer-class patrol vessels
1986 ships